Stanek is a Polish-language gender-neutral surname. Obsolete feminine forms are Stankowa (married) and Stankówna (maiden). It originated as a diminutive of the given name Stanisław.

It is also a Polish noble surname belonging to the Pobóg clan.

The Czech-language variant of the surname is Staněk.

Notable people with this surname include:
Al Stanek, American baseball player
Jim Stanek, American actor
Ryan Stanek, drummer with Broken Hope
Ryne Stanek, baseball player
Sonja Stanek, Austrian figure skater
Hanna Stankówna, Polish actress

References

Polish-language surnames